Gérard Sartoro (born 16 October 1961) is a French wrestler. He competed at the 1984 Summer Olympics, the 1988 Summer Olympics and the 1992 Summer Olympics.

References

External links
 

1961 births
Living people
French male sport wrestlers
Olympic wrestlers of France
Wrestlers at the 1984 Summer Olympics
Wrestlers at the 1988 Summer Olympics
Wrestlers at the 1992 Summer Olympics
People from Auchel
Sportspeople from Pas-de-Calais